Limbé is an arrondissement in the Nord department of Haiti. As of 2015, the population was 106,201 inhabitants. Postal codes in the Limbé Arrondissement start with the number 16.

The arondissement consists of the following municipalities:
 Limbé
 Bas-Limbé
 Labadee

References

Arrondissements of Haiti
Nord (Haitian department)